Sounds of the Animal Kingdom is a studio album by grindcore band Brutal Truth. This album features a more varied style than previous albums, displaying the band's typical grindcore and death metal sound fused with elements of doom metal, stoner rock, crust punk,  experimental rock, and elements of other genres.

The album's closing track "Prey" is actually a 2-second snippet from "Average People" which repeats for 22 minutes, gradually becoming louder. On the vinyl release of the album, the song (instead of being stretched out to 22 minutes) is contained within a locked groove; which as a result makes the 2-second “song” loop infinitely until the listener lifts the record player’s needle.

A remastered version that includes the 1996 mini-album Kill Trend Suicide was released in 2006. It is Brutal Truth's last album to feature Brent McCarthy.

Track listing

Personnel
Kevin Sharp – vocals
Dan Lilker – bass, backing vocals
Brent McCarthy – guitars
Rich Hoak – drums

Production
Billy Anderson – production, engineering, mixing
Brutal Truth – engineering, mixing
Juan Garcia – engineering, mixing

References

Brutal Truth albums
1997 albums
Relapse Records albums
Albums produced by Billy Anderson (producer)